Goldfield Airport  was a county-owned, public-use airport located  north of the central business district of Goldfield, the county seat of Esmeralda County, Nevada, United States. The airport closed in 2007.

Esmeralda county is exploring opening the airport again for public use. However, there is questions to the legality of the land owned, The county states that all the land is public land. But the bureau of land management claims that the airport cannot be reopened until all mineral rights are resolved.

Facilities and aircraft 
Goldfield Airport covered an area of 145 acres (59 ha) at an elevation of 5,680 feet (1,731 m) above mean sea level. It has one runway designated 17/35 with a gravel surface measuring 3,150 by 37 feet (960 x 11 m). For the 12-month period ending June 30, 2005, the airport had 300 general aviation aircraft operations, an average of 25 per month: 92% local and 8% transient.

See also 
 Lida Junction Airport

References

External links 
  from Nevada DOT
 Aerial image as of September 1999 from USGS The National Map
 Aeronautical chart from SkyVector

Defunct airports in Nevada
Buildings and structures in Esmeralda County, Nevada
Transportation in Esmeralda County, Nevada
2007 disestablishments in Nevada